The Cholas, the Tamil kings of the Chola dynasty who had ruled most parts of South India, maintained a strong relationship with the Chinese.

Relationship during second century BC 
The relationship between the Chinese and Cholas dates back to second century BC. Ancient Chinese scholar Ban Gu had told that China had sent its ambassador to the court of the Cholas.
Ban Gu in his work the Book of Han (Ch'ien Han Shu) had written that he had seen many unprecedented objects which are unseen at China, at the city of kuvangtche. Berend, an acoustics expert, annotates that the city named by Ban Gu is analogous with the ancient Chola city kanchi (the present day's city of Kancheepuram at Tamil Nadu, India). This proves the relationship of Kanchi with China.

Coins 
Arrays of ancient Chinese coins have been found in recent years at the place which is considered to be the homeland of the Cholas (i.e. the present Thanjavur, Tiruvarur and Pudukkottai districts of Tamil Nadu, India), which confirms the trade and the commercial relationship which existed between the Cholas and the Chinese.

Relationship during eleventh century AD 
The later Cholas too continued to maintain a healthy relationship with the Chinese. During the reign of Rajendra Chola I (i.e. 1016–1033 AD) and Kulothunga Chola I (i.e. in 1077 AD), commercial and political diplomats were sent to China.

References

Chola Empire
History of the foreign relations of India